The 2016 Brabantse Pijl was a one-day cycling road race that took place on 13 April 2016. The course ran  from Leuven to Overijse in Flanders. The race was the 56th edition of the Brabantse Pijl and was rated as a 1.HC event as part of the 2016 UCI Europe Tour.

Race 
The race was organised by Flanders Classics and marked the transition from the cobbled classics in Flanders to the Ardennes classics in Wallonia. The race included 26  (small hills) that formed the principal difficulty in the race. The race therefore suited the puncheurs, such as Ben Hermans, the defending champion. Other favourites included Michael Matthews, Tom-Jelte Slagter, Julian Alaphilippe and Tony Gallopin. One of the other favourites for the race, Philippe Gilbert (BMC), was ruled out of the race with a broken finger after an "altercation" with a driver during training.

After attacks throughout the latter half of the race, a five-man group formed in the final , made up of Alaphilippe, Gallopin, Petr Vakoč, David Tanner and Enrico Gasparotto. Alaphilippe put in a long effort in support of Vakoč, which dropped Tanner. On the final climb, Vakoč attacked and no one was able to follow. He finished six seconds ahead of Gasparotto, with Gallopin third. Bryan Coquard beat Matthews in the sprint for fourth place, 20 seconds behind Vakoč.

Results

References

External links 

 

Brabantse Pijl
Brabantse Pijl
2016